KGAB (650 AM) is a radio station broadcasting a News Talk Information format. It is licensed to Orchard Valley, Wyoming, and serves the Cheyenne, Wyoming, area and operates with daytime power of 8,500 watts. The station is owned and operated by Townsquare Media.

Signal

Day
During daylight hours, KGAB operates a non-directional signal of 8.5 kw using one tower on Terry Ranch Road which provides a local coverage to all of Laramie County, as well as the city of Laramie, and the  Fort Collins-Greeley-Loveland area. A decent signal is available to the Denver area, as well as a decent swath of Southeast and Central Wyoming including Casper, while a barely readable signal reaches Colorado Springs. The daytime signal has been reported in Salt Lake City and in Missouri.

Night
The station does not adjust its power during sunrise and sunset, therefore allowing a window where the station extends its coverage dramatically. 
At night, class-B KGAB is required to drop their signal to 500 watts, which points directionally north-west to protect clear-channels WSM Nashville and KENI Anchorage.  This provides a local signal to Cheyenne and Laramie, and can provide a skywave signal to Casper and even Billings. The nighttime signal has reportedly been received as far as Finland at night.

Translator
In order to serve a younger audience, KGAB began testing a broadcast translator on 99.5 FM in July 2021, at the tower site of sister-station KIGN, as part of AM revitalization; it operated with 250 watts non-directional ERP.

Around mid-August, the signal was again off the air due to the COVID-19 pandemic causing backlogs for the construction company involved; as a result, the translator will instead use an old antenna at the same site, and it will be directionalized towards Cheyenne. When the translator (K258DN) was on the first time around, it faced massive interference from both KQMT in Denver, as well as excessive overlap from a transmitter in downtown Cheyenne. On September 7, 2021, the new antenna system was approved for the translator, and the license to cover was granted. The station officially returned to the air on October 12, using the new antenna and contour.

Under the old set-up, the translator produced a strong local-grade signal to much of Cheyenne, despite the aforementioned interference, and it could be heard up to Burns and Pine Bluffs. The west side of Cheyenne, particularly near  I-180, reception proved to be difficult for most listeners, due to overlapping interference from a tower on 15th street not having their bandwidth adjusted properly. Under the new construction permit, the KGAB translator will provide a good signal to the city of Cheyenne, to hopefully prevent interference. However, it will throw a severe null to its east, preventing most listening this way. Officially, the city of license, Orchard Valley, is the same as KGAB's COL; however, the tower itself is closer to Altvan, Wyoming.

History

The station was assigned the call sign KVWO on June 9, 1978, which moved to a low-power station in Welch, Oklahoma

On October 11, 1979, the station changed its call sign to KUUY and on December 9, 1996, to KMRZ. On March 21, 1997, the station became the current KGAB.

There is evidence that KGAB operated at 8,600 watts at times as opposed to the licensed 8,500 during the early 21st century.

Programming
Main source: On Air

On Weekdays, most shows are nationally syndicated, and conservatively leaning,  including Rush Limbaugh, Sean Hannity, Dave Ramsey III (a financial analyst), Ken Coleman,  Michael Savage, Ben Shapiro, and Coast To Coast AM with George Noory.  The early morning timeslot offers a regionally syndicated program called "Wake Up Wyoming w/Glenn Woods", as well as the national "This Morning w/Mark Deal".

Upon the passing of Rush Limbaugh, guest hosts narrated past episodes of the show, in his honor; Premiere networks eventually chose Dan Bongino as the replacement for the timeslot

On Saturdays, KGAB presents several hours worth of local programming, including Kar-Gab, featuring "Nick the Motor Guy", described as an escaped Englishman, and This Weekend in Wyoming'' with Doug Randall, a local anchor. The afternoon line-up features Joe Pags, while the evening line-up again includes Dave Ramsey and George Noory.

On Sundays, KGAB switches back to hosting nationally syndicated broadcasts, including Hannity at an earlier time, as well as the Dave Ramsey show (although the Sunday edition is hosted by Anthony O'Neil so he can produce his show for nearby KOA. In addition, Bill Cunningham runs the 10pm time-slot.

News updates are provided either by Fox News, or by the local staff, mainly Doug Randall and Joy Greenwald, and appear at the top and bottom of each hour. Weather is also provided during these times, often provided by Cheyenne based "Day-Weather".

As of 2021, KGAB clears the entire Buffalo Bills football schedule, as a result of former Wyoming quarterback Josh Allen having moved to the Bills.

KGAB in popular culture
The Oliver Stone movie Talk Radio takes place at a fictional radio station called KGAB, located in Dallas, Texas. The movie was made in 1988, and as KGAB's current call sign only dates back to 1997, it is unknown if the name was taken from the movie.

In "The A-Team" episode "Cowboy George", originally aired February 11, 1986, and guest-starring Boy George, KGAB was a top-40 country and western station serving Mono County and Twin Rivers, Arizona. In an effort to promote a concert, "Howling Mad" Murdock posed as a guest DJ playing "The Lennon Sisters" songs.

References

Notes

External links
Official Website

FCC History Cards for KGAB

GAB
News and talk radio stations in the United States
Townsquare Media radio stations